Brittany Tully (born 3 May 1993) is an Australian rules footballer and Softballer.

Tully plays for the Greater Western Sydney Giants in the AFL Women's competition and retired in 2021. She was drafted by Greater Western Sydney with their tenth selection and eightieth overall in the 2016 AFL Women's draft. She played every match in her debut season to finish with seven games and ranked second for tackles and third in clearances in the league. She placed 3rd in the GWS Best & Fairest Gabriel Trainor Medal in 2017.

Tully won the best and fairest of AFL Canberra Women's for three consecutive years, between 2016 and 2018.

Tully was listed as an inactive player for GWS for personal reasons in 2019 but has now been recontracted to resume with GWS for the 2020 season. In June 2021, she retired.

She plays for Boomerangs Softball Club in Canberra and played for the ACT Diamonds in the Softball Australia National Competition (Gillies Shield) from 2012 to 2016. She was an Australian Schoolgirls representative in 2010.

AFLW statistics
 Statistics are correct to the end of the 2017 season

|- style="background-color: #EAEAEA"
! scope="row" style="text-align:center" | 2017
|
| 16 || 7 || 0 || 2 || 53 || 19 || 72 || 5 || 28 || 0.0 || 0.3 || 7.6 || 2.7 || 10.3 || 0.7 || 4.0 
|- class="sortbottom"
! colspan=3| Career
! 7
! 0
! 2
! 53
! 19
! 72
! 5
! 28
! 0.0
! 0.3
! 7.6
! 2.7
! 10.3
! 0.7
! 4.0
|}

References

External links 

1993 births
Living people
Greater Western Sydney Giants (AFLW) players
Australian rules footballers from the Australian Capital Territory